The term district, in the context of China, is used to refer to several unrelated political divisions in both ancient and modern China.

In the modern context, district, formally city-governed district, city-controlled district, or municipal district, are subdivisions of a municipality or a prefecture-level city. The rank of a district derives from the rank of its city. Districts of a municipality are prefecture-level; districts of a sub-provincial city are sub-prefecture-level; and districts of a prefecture-level city are county-level.

The term was also formerly used to refer to obsolete county-controlled districts (also known as district public office).

However, if the word district is encountered in the context of ancient Chinese history, then it is a translation for xian, another type of administrative division in China.

Before the 1980s, cities in China were administrative divisions containing mostly urban, built-up areas, with very little farmland, except for the immediate suburbs in order to ensure a large supply of food or raw materials. As a result, districts were also mostly urban or suburban in nature.

After the 1980s, prefectures began to be replaced with prefecture-level cities. From then on, "cities" in mainland China became just like any other administrative division, containing urban areas, towns, villages, and farmland. These cities are subdivided into districts, counties, autonomous counties, and county-level cities. At the same time, counties and county-level cities began to be replaced with districts, especially after 1990. From then onwards, districts were no longer strictly urban entities—some districts today are just like counties, with large towns and townships under them governing rural areas.

Types of districts

Regular districts

A regular district under a municipality or prefecture-level city.

Ethnic districts
A type of city districts that are specially created for ethnic minorities. Currently there are five such "ethnic districts": three in Henan, one in Heilongjiang and one in Inner Mongolia.
Chanhe Hui District
Guancheng Hui District
Shunhe Hui District
Meilisi Daur District
Huimin District (the term Huimin refers to the Hui people)

Special districts
A special county-level division located in Guizhou.
 Liuzhi Special District, Liupanshui

Forestry districts
A special sub-prefectural-level forestry district located in Hubei.
 Shennongjia

Ten most populated districts

Number of districts per city

County-controlled districts (obsolete)
A county-controlled district, sometimes translated as county-governed district; county district; or sub-county is a sub-county in China. A branch of a county government, a district public office is the administrative office in a district; it is not a local government. A county-controlled district was once an important subdivision of a county all over China from the 1950s to 1990s. It was common for there to be about five to ten districts in a county, then about three to five towns and townships in a district. After the 1990s, county-controlled districts began to be phased out, and their role was taken over by larger towns or townships created by merging smaller ones.

At the end of 2014, there was just one county-controlled district left in China:
Nanshan District (Zhuolu County, Zhangjiakou, Hebei)

(See Administrative divisions of China for how these two types of districts fit into the general administrative hierarchy of mainland China.)

Ancient sense 

If the word "district" is encountered in the context of ancient Chinese history, then the word is a translation for xian, another type of administrative division in China.

Xian has been translated using several English terms. In the context of ancient history, "district" and "prefecture" are commonly used, while "county" is used for more contemporary contexts.

(See Counties of China for more information on the xian of China.)

See also 
 List of districts in China
 District
Gu (administrative division) in South Korea
Ku in Japan

References

 
County-level divisions of the People's Republic of China